Foreign Body is a 2016 Tunisian drama film directed and written by Raja Amari.

Plot
A young lady escaped from her home in Tunisia and illegally migrated to France. She finds joy and struggles in her journey.

Cast 
Hiam Abbass 
Sarra Hannachi 
Salim Kechiouche 
Marc Brunet 
Majd Mastoura

References

External links
 

2016 films
Tunisian drama films
Films set in Lyon
Films shot in Lyon